Valldalen (or sometimes just Valldal) is a valley in Fjord Municipality in Møre og Romsdal county, Norway. It is located north of the Norddalsfjorden. The village of Sylte (which is also called Valldal) is located at the end of the valley along the fjord. The river Valldøla flows through the valley, and the Norwegian National Road 63 follows the river through the valley, on its way north to Trollstigen.

The valley lies just outside the northwestern border of Reinheimen National Park. The valley is fertile with a high amount of berry production, especially strawberries. Previously there was also cement and wood products industry. There is also the Muritunet centre for rehabilitation.

The 2015 film Ex Machina was filmed at Juvet Landscape Hotel in Valldalen.

References

External links

Fjord (municipality)
Valleys of Møre og Romsdal